Mourad Salem is a Tunisian artist based in Paris, France. His works question historical leaders, often depicting them as immature power-hungry figures. In 2013, Salem's exhibition "Sultans Are No Sultans" debuted at the Nour Festival of Arts from the Middle East and North Africa at the Leighton House Museum in London. Salem is of Turkish origin.

Early life and education 

Mourad Salem was born in Tunis, Tunisia. His father was Tunisian and his mother French. He spent his youth in Tunis until he was 18. He studied in Canada and France where he lived for many years.

He graduated in Biology,  Biochemistry and Pharmacy. He received a Doctorate in Pharmacy at the University of Strasbourg, France.

He then started in the eighties a career as an artist that drove him to New York and Dublin, Rep of Ireland.

Pier Kirkeby, the danish artist and the German  Neo-expressionism had a major impact on him at the start of his career.

Exhibitions 
The last few years he exhibited in numerous venues:

The most notable were:

Institut du Monde Arabe, Paris, France, 2012: " Le corps découvert". Leighton House Museum, London, UK, 2013: "Sultans are no sultans", curated by Rose Issa project.

"Open your eyes" 2014, Rose Issa Galey, London , UK. Art Fair, Dubaï, UAE, El Marsa Gallery. "Ambivalences suspectes", Gahya gallery, Tunis, Tunisia, 2015. "Arab Territories", Constantine, Algeria, curated by Nadira Laggoune, 2015.

References

Tunisian people of Turkish descent
Tunisian contemporary artists
Tunisian expatriates in France
People from Tunis
20th-century Tunisian artists
21st-century Tunisian artists
University of Strasbourg alumni
Year of birth missing (living people)
Living people